The 2012–13 Welsh Premier League was the fourth season of the Welsh Premier League (women), Wales' premier football league. It is the first season to feature a single division league. The season starts on 16 September 2012 and ended on 19 May 2013.

After several high defeats Cearphilly Castle withdrew from the league after ten matches. All results including them were then wiped from the table.

The title was won by Cardiff City for the first time. They finished ahead of reigning champions Cardiff Met. on superior goal difference.

Changes from 2011–12
The league expanded from 10 teams last season to 12 teams this season. The new teams are Llandudno Junction and Cardiff City.
The league is not played in Northern and Southern conference any more, but a single division. The championship final is also abolished. The leading team after 22 matches is the champion.
UWIC Ladies changed their name to Cardiff Met. Ladies F.C.
Treflin Ladies joined Port Talbot Town F.C. and now compete under their name.

Clubs

Standings

Results
Newcastly Emlyn set a Premier League record win when they defeated Caerphilly Castle 36–0 on 12 January 2013. On that day Bethan Davies also set the record for most goals scored in a match with ten. Both records were later broken by Cardiff Met. Ladies, when then won 43–0 at Caerphilly Castle, with Emily Allen and Adele Hooper scoring 15 and 12 goals respectively. Those records are void now after the withdrawal of Caerphilly Castle.

References

External links
welshpremier.com
League at uefa.com
welsh-premier.com
Unofficial website

2012-13
Wales Women
2012–13 in Welsh football leagues
1